For Romania national football team results see:

 Romania national football team results (1922–39)
 Romania national football team results (1940–59)
 Romania national football team results (1960–79)
 Romania national football team results (1980–99)
 Romania national football team results (2000–19)
 Romania national football team results (2020–present)

 
results and fixtures